Dace Lina (born 1 December 1981) is a Latvian marathon runner. She was born in Bauska, Latvia. She has won Valmiera Marathon in 2010. Lina competed at 2012 Summer Olympics, completing the course and finishing in 98th place.

References

External links
 
 
 
 
 

1981 births
Living people
Latvian female marathon runners
People from Bauska
Athletes (track and field) at the 2012 Summer Olympics
Olympic athletes of Latvia